Marcello Varallo (born 8 October 1947) is a retired Italian alpine skier. He placed 10th in the downhill at the 1972 Winter Olympics and finished third in the 1973 Alpine Ski World Cup in this discipline.

References

External links
 

1947 births
Living people
Italian male alpine skiers
Olympic alpine skiers of Italy
Alpine skiers at the 1972 Winter Olympics
Alpine skiers of Fiamme Gialle